Alessandro Tiarini (20 March 1577 – 8 February 1668) was an Italian Baroque painter of the Bolognese School.

Biography

Alessandro Tiarini was born in Bologna. His mother died when he was a child, and he was raised by an aunt. Early on his family tried, unsuccessfully, to guide him towards becoming a cleric. He was the godson of painter Lavinia Fontana and initially apprenticed in Bologna under her father Prospero Fontana, and subsequently with Bartolomeo Cesi. He was not inducted into the Carracci Academy. Forced to flee from Bologna, due to what Malvasia and Amorini describe as a quarrel leading to the death of the other party, he moved to Florence, where he painted frescoes, façade decorations, and altarpieces (1599–1606) including an Adoration of the Shepherds (Pitti Palace). In Florence, he mainly worked under Domenico Passignano, but also Bernardino Poccetti and Jacopo da Empoli.

He was lured back to Bologna and Reggio Emilia, by Ludovico Carracci. His Grieving over a dead Jesus is in the Pinacoteca Nazionale of Bologna. He painted a series of frescoes for the Brami Chapel in the sanctuary, as well as other works, for the  Basilica della Ghiara in Reggio Emilia.  He also painted in Cremona (1623–24).  In 1628, where he painted the Story of Gerusalemme Liberata for the Farnese Palazzo del Giardino in Parma. He also painted the Raising of the Cross for the Oratorio della Buona Morte in Reggio, a work now displayed in the Galleria Estense of Modena and Judith and Holofernes for the church of Santa Maria di Canepanova in Pavia.

He painted a Virgin, Mary Magdalene, and St John, weeping over the instruments of the Passion for church of S. Benedetto; St. Catherine kneeling before a Crucifix for Santa Maria Maddalena; a Pietà for Sant'Antonio; and St Dominic resurrecting a child for the church of San Domenico. Other works in  Bologna include a Martyrdom of St. Barbara for the San Petronio Basilica, a Nativity for Santissimo Salvatore, and a Flight to Egypt for San Vitale.

Tiarini died in Bologna. His closest pupils were Francesco Carbone and Luca Barbieri.

Gallery

References

Further reading

External links

1577 births
1668 deaths
16th-century Italian painters
Italian male painters
17th-century Italian painters
Italian Baroque painters
Painters from Bologna